The 2021 Rackley Roofing 200 was the 12th stock car race of the 2021 NASCAR Camping World Truck Series season, and the 12th iteration of the event, after a 9-year absence from racing at the track from all 3 major series of NASCAR. The race was held on Friday, June 18, 2021 in Lebanon, Tennessee at Nashville Superspeedway, a  permanent D-shaped oval course. Ryan Preece, riding for David Gilliland Racing as a one-off race, would win his first ever race in the NASCAR Camping World Truck Series in his first ever start. Todd Gilliland of Front Row Motorsports and Grant Enfinger of ThorSport Racing would garner the rest of the podium positions, finishing 2nd and 3rd, respectively.

William Byron would make his return to the series driving a one-off race for Rackley WAR.

Background 
Nashville Superspeedway is a motor racing complex located in Gladeville, Tennessee (though the track has a Lebanon address), United States, about 30 miles (48 km) southeast of Nashville. The track was built in 2001 and is currently used for events, driving schools and GT Academy, a reality television competition.

It is a concrete oval track 11⁄3 miles (2.145 km) long. Nashville Superspeedway is owned by Dover Motorsports, Inc., which also owns Dover International Speedway. Nashville Superspeedway was the longest concrete oval in NASCAR during the time it was on the NASCAR Xfinity Series and NASCAR Camping World Truck Series circuits. Current permanent seating capacity is approximately 25,000. Additional portable seats are brought in for some events, and seating capacity can be expanded to 150,000. Infrastructure is in place to expand the facility to include a short track, drag strip, and road course.

Entry list

Practice 
The first and final practice would take place on Friday, June 18, at 11:56 AM EST.

Qualifying 
Qualifying would take place on Friday, June 18, at 6:08 AM EST.

Race results 
Stage 1 Laps: 45

Stage 2 Laps: 50

Stage 3 Laps: 55

References 

2021 NASCAR Camping World Truck Series
NASCAR races at Nashville Superspeedway
Rackley Roofing 200
Rackley Roofing 200